The Air Tractor AT-400 is a family of agricultural aircraft that first flew in the United States on September 1979. Type certification was awarded to Air Tractor in April 1980. Of low-wing monoplane taildragger configuration, they carry a chemical hopper between the engine firewall and the cockpit.

Variants
 AT-400 - AT-301 with 680 shp (507 kW) Pratt & Whitney Canada PT6A-15AG engine and 400 US gal (1,510 L) hopper. Short-span (45 ft 1¼ in (13.75 m)) wings. 72 built.
AT-400A - AT-400 with 550 hp (410 kW) Pratt & Whitney Canada PT6A-20 engine. 14 built. 
 AT-401 - AT-301 with longer-span wings and 400 US gal (1,510 L) hopper, powered by 600 hp (447 kW) Pratt & Whitney R-1340 radial engine. 168 built.
 AT-401A - AT-401 with PZL-3S engine. One built.
 AT-401B -Improved revision of AT-401, with revised wingtips and further increased span (51 ft 1¼ in (15.57 m)). 69 built by December 2001.
 AT-402 - AT-401 with Pratt & Whitney Canada PT6A-15 engine. 68 built.
 AT-402A - low cost version of AT-401B, with Pratt & Whitney Canada PT6A-20 engine. 103 built by December 2001. 
 AT-402B - improved version of AT-402, with revised wingtips and increased span of AT-401B. 31 built by December 2001.

Specifications (AT-401)

See also

References

Notes

Bibliography

External links

 Air Tractor - www.airtractor.com

AT-400
1970s United States agricultural aircraft
Single-engined tractor aircraft
Single-engined turboprop aircraft
Low-wing aircraft
Aircraft first flown in 1979